Midwest Radio may refer to:

Midwest Radio (UK), a radio station in the UK previously known as Ivel FM and Vale FM
Midwest Communications, also known as Midwest Radio Group
MidWest Radio, a radio station in the Republic of Ireland
Tipperary Mid-West Community Radio, a community radio station in Tipperary, Ireland

See also
Midwest Radio Network, an Australian broadcasting and digital media company